Rudraige may refer to:

Rudraige mac Dela, son of Dela, legendary High King of Ireland in the 16th or 20th century BC
Rudraige mac Sithrigi, son of Sitric, legendary High King of Ireland of the 2nd or 3rd century BC
Rudraige, in medieval Irish mythology, son of Partholón